Neuseenland is an area south of Leipzig, Germany, where old open-cast mines are being converted into a huge lake district. The region's name is a marketing concept and it means "New Lakeland" in German. It should not be confused with the German name for New Zealand, "Neuseeland". It is planned to be finished in 2060 It is a part of the larger Central German Lake District.

It contains the following lakes, some of which are not yet flooded:
       

* 3 former open-cast mines north of Leipzig.

Altogether they have an expanse of 30,000 ha, approx 116 mi². Once fully flooded they will have a final expanse of 270 mi² (70,000 ha).

References

Notes

External links

 The Touristic Water Network Leipziger Neuseenland

Geography of Saxony
Mining in Saxony